Catocala praegnax is a moth in the family Erebidae first described by Francis Walker in 1858. It is found in Japan, northern China and Taiwan.

Subspecies
Catocala praegnax praegnax
Catocala praegnax sakaii Kishida, 1981 (Taiwan)

References

praegnax
Moths described in 1877
Moths of Asia